Matsudai may refer to:

Places
 Matsudai, Niigata, a former town in Niigata, Japan, now merged into Tōkamachi
 Matsudai Station, a train station in Tōkamachi, Niigata, Japan

Species
 Acupicta bubases matsudai, a butterfly in the family Lycaenid
 Euseboides matsudai, a beetle in the family Cerambycidae
 Phyllonorycter matsudai, a moth of the family Gracillariidae
 Sparganothis matsudai, a moth in the family Tortricidae

Other uses
 Miyajima Matsudai Kisen, a Japanese ferry company

See also
 Matsudaira clan